The 1880 United States presidential election in North Carolina took place on November 2, 1880, as part of the 1880 United States presidential election. Voters chose ten representatives, or electors to the Electoral College, who voted for president and vice president.

North Carolina voted for the Democratic candidates, Major General Winfield Scott Hancock and his running mate William Hayden English, over the Republican candidates, U.S. Representative James A. Garfield and his running mate Chester A. Arthur. Hancock won North Carolina narrowly by a margin of 3.57 percent.

Results

Results by county

References 

North Carolina
1880
1880 North Carolina elections